The Christian Heritage Party of British Columbia (CHP-BC; formerly the British Columbia Heritage Party) is a minor provincial political party in British Columbia, Canada and a provincial wing of the federal Christian Heritage Party of Canada. The party advocates in favour of establishing a constitution to govern the province of British Columbia. The party registered with Elections BC in September 2010. A leadership election was held in 2011 between Wilf Hanni and Mischa Popoff, in which Hanni was re-confirmed as leader. Following internal party disputes, several members left to join the Individual Rights Party of British Columbia, including Mischa Popoff who became that party's leader. Hanni stepped down in 2013 due to family health issues and Rod Taylor became the interim leader. Laura-Lynn Tyler Thompson was elected as the party's leader on September 15, 2020. Thompson previously ran as a candidate for the People's Party of Canada in the 2019 Burnaby South federal by-election.

Policies 
The party was founded as the British Columbia Heritage Party with the stated objective "to restore and preserve our Great Canadian heritage, granted by our Creator, which is the foundation of our democratic system of government, in order to bring effective and accountable government to British Columbia". Party leader Wilf Hanni stated that the first priority in a government controlled by the BC Heritage Party would be to implement a six-point plan for democratic reforms, including preferential voting to replace the existing first-past-the-post voting, free votes, holding more referendums, making it easier to recall elected officials and implement citizens initiatives. Their second priority would be to review the tax structure and replace the taxation system so that the government is funded solely through a single rate income tax or a single rate consumption tax (decided in a referendum). The party plans to introduce "made-in-BC" constitution, with the framework drafted by the party but revised by a citizens' assembly.

The BC Heritage Party published, in September 2010, a document of policy positions, including lowering political donation amounts from corporations, unions, individuals to a maximum of $10,000 per year, halt government attempts to combat global warming, implement zero-based budgeting, encourage industrial development of in the Interior, place an export duty on raw logs, seek to build a bridge from the Lower Mainland to Vancouver Island, prohibit unauthorized access to private property for the purposes of mineral exploration, among other policy points.

In September 2011, members of the BC Heritage Party voted in favour of seeking to become a provincial wing of the Christian Heritage Party of Canada. The federal Christian Heritage Party agreed and in March 2012 the BC Heritage Party became the Christian Heritage Party of British Columbia.

It nominated five candidates in the 2017 provincial election, none of whom was elected.

During the 2020 provincial election, the party nominated five candidates again, but this time with their new leader, Laura-Lynn Tyler Thompson. She ran in the Abbotsford South riding, and had the most votes out of all the CHP-BC candidates, with 1,439. She had a vote share of 9.20%. Rod Taylor, the National Leader of CHP Canada, ran in Stikine. As a result, he got 755 votes, and a 12.68% vote share, the highest out of all five CHP-BC candidates. None of them got elected.

Leaders

Results

References

External links 
 

Provincial political parties in British Columbia
Conservative parties in Canada
2010 establishments in British Columbia
Protestant political parties
Political parties established in 2010
Social conservative parties